The Crawford Automobile Company was an automobile manufacturing company based in Hagerstown, Maryland which produced cars 1905–1923. After the Crawford Automobile Company was purchased by the M. P. Moller Pipe Organ Co., they produced a sporting version of the Crawford called the Dagmar (in production until 1927).

Crawfords were chain-driven until 1907, and the 1911–1914 models feature transaxles. Later cars featured brass trim, disc-covered wooden artillery wheels, and Continental six-cylinder engines.

See also
 List of defunct automobile manufacturers

References

Defunct motor vehicle manufacturers of the United States
American companies established in 1905
1905 establishments in Maryland
American companies disestablished in 1923
Vehicle manufacturing companies established in 1905
Vehicle manufacturing companies disestablished in 1923
Defunct manufacturing companies based in Maryland